The Last Dance is a live album by the English rock band Magnum, released in 1996 by SPV. This is the European release; the UK release was called Stronghold.

Track listing

Personnel
Tony Clarkin — guitar
Bob Catley — vocals
Wally Lowe — bass guitar
Mark Stanway — keyboards
Mickey Barker — drums

References

External links
 www.magnumonline.co.uk — Official Magnum site

Magnum (band) live albums
1996 live albums
SPV/Steamhammer live albums